Silchar Airport  is a domestic airport serving Silchar, Assam, India. It is located at Kumbhirgram, 29 km (18 mi) from the city centre. It was built by the British as RAF Station Kumbhirgram in 1944 and transferred to the Royal Indian Air Force (RIAF). It is also a civil enclave airport as it is under the control of Indian Air Force.  The airport is situated on the foothills of the Barail range. It is the fifth busiest airport of the north-east India next to Guwahati, Agartala and Imphal & Dibrugarh.
Passenger traffic in Silchar Airport showed a sharp growth of 72.9% in 2017-18, and handled 366,955 passengers. While in 2018-19, the traffic growth was reported 5.4% to 386,665. 
As of 2018-19 data available with Airports Authority of India, Silchar Airport is 47th busiest airport in India and the 49th busiest in respect of aircraft movement. Silchar Airport is 43rd busiest in cargo transportation, as of 2017-18.

Infrastructure 
The airport's terminal, handling domestic flights, it has a runway capable of handling aircraft such as the Boeing 737 and the Airbus A320. Amenities include a restaurant, a handicrafts shop, ATMs, chocolates shop, and free WiFi. The runway is equipped with Precision Approach Path Indicator (PAPI) visual aid for both side of the runway, that enables pilots to maintain the correct approach (in the vertical plane) towards the airport and the Instrument landing system (ILS) provides a direction for approaching when the aircraft tune its receiver to the ILS frequency, it provides both lateral and a vertical signals. Glide slope station which is an antenna array sited to one side of the runway touchdown zone is also available towards the runway.

Facilities 

Silchar airport is situated at an elevation of 338 feet above the sea level. It covers the land area of 36.70 acres. There is only one domestic terminal. The terminal has four check-in counters along with one boarding gate to handle nearly 300 passengers at a given time with 150 each at the arrival and the departure section. Rest rooms are also available for transit passengers with charges applied as per AAI rules. There are two conveyor belts available in the arrival building to support multiple aircraft at a single time. Indian Oil handles the Aviation fuel service department of Silchar Airport. Silchar airport has a variety of options for eating and shopping at the airport premises. Moreover, shops selling local handicraft items are also there at the airport. The airport comes under the administrative control of the Airports Authority of India. The guidelines prescribed by the Airports Authority of India are adhered to while carrying out the daily operations of Silchar Airport.

Airlines and destinations

: The flight is operated via a stop at Kolkata.

Statistics

Transport

The Assam State Transport Corporation (ASTC) operates the Volvo air-conditioned bus services to Silchar airport from Rangirkhari Point and the Inter-State Bus Terminus (ISBT). From the ISBT one can find buses to other cities of the north-eastern region. 
Besides Taxis are also available to and from the Airport to city, Hailakandi & Karimganj.

References

External links

Silchar
Airports in Assam
Transport in Silchar
Military airbases established in 1944
1944 establishments in India
Royal Air Force stations of World War II in Asia